Leslie Fitzgerald was a Scottish amateur football inside forward who played in the Scottish League for Queen's Park and Ayr United. He was capped by Scotland at amateur level.

References 

Scottish footballers
Queen's Park F.C. players
Scottish Football League players
Scotland amateur international footballers
1909 births
People from Dennistoun
Year of death missing
Place of death missing
Ayr United F.C. players
Association football inside forwards